The Multi-source hypothesis is a proposed solution to the synoptic problem, holding that Matthew, Mark, and Luke are not directly interdependent but have each drawn from a distinct combination of earlier documents. It encompasses a family of theories differing in the particulars of the nature and relationships of these earlier documents.

An early form of the theory was proposed by Marsh over two centuries ago. More recently, Boismard proposed a structurally similar theory, which was further developed by Rolland and Burkett.

According to these theories, the common material among the three synoptic gospels ultimately derives from a proto-gospel somewhat like Mark. This proto-gospel underwent two independent revisions, A and B. Mark was formed by recombining these two revisions. Matthew built upon A and Luke upon B. Both Matthew and Luke also drew from a common source Q, as well as other source sources for their unique material.

See also 
 Two-source hypothesis
 Source criticism

References

Sources 
  (translated by Lorraine Caza, Robert Beck and Francis Martin)
 
 
 

Synoptic problem
Hypotheses